Bufotenidine, also known as 5-hydroxy-N,N,N-trimethyltryptammonium (5-HTQ), is a toxin related to bufotenin, serotonin, and other tryptamines which is found in the venom of a variety of toads. It acts as a selective 5-HT3 receptor agonist, and has been used in scientific research to study the function of the 5-HT3 receptor, though this use has been limited by the fact that, as a quaternary amine, it is unable to readily cross the blood-brain-barrier.

See also
 2-Methyl-5-HT
 Chlorophenylbiguanide

References

5-HT3 agonists
Emetics
Tryptamines
Vertebrate toxins
Drugs with no legal status